The 2015–16 season of the Belgian Pro League (also known as Jupiler Pro League for sponsorship reasons) was the 113th season of top-tier football in Belgium. It started in the last week of July 2015 and finished in May 2016. Gent were the defending champions.

This was the last season under the "Pro League" name; a reorganisation of the Belgian professional leagues followed the season, with the top league to be known from 2016–17 forward as "First Division A".

Changes from 2014–15

Structural changes
Some changes were introduced in comparison to the previous season, with the most important one being the relegation rules. Instead of organising a relegation playoff between the teams finishing in the two last positions, this season will rather see the last team relegated immediately, while the 15th placed team will not play in any playoff and will remain in the renamed Belgian First Division A.

Several other smaller changes were introduced, namely:
 The team finishing on top of the table following the regular season, will be assured at least place in the 2016–17 UEFA Europa League in case they drop out of the top two positions and thereby miss out on the 2016–17 UEFA Champions League. They will be awarded a spot in the 2016–17 UEFA Europa League Third qualifying round, or even the Group stage in case the 2015–16 Belgian Cup winners finish in the top two.
 In case two or more teams finish with equal points after the Championship Playoff, the first tiebreaker will now be the finishing position during the regular season.
 The disciplinary record (number of yellow cards) will now be erased for all players after conclusion of the regular season. Any suspensions already obtained will be kept. In addition, during the playoffs, players will now pick up a one match ban already after three yellow cards, rather than five as during the regular season.

The first two of these rules were put in force as a compensation for the rule that the points obtained during the regular season are halved prior to the start of the championship playoff, to the complaint of several teams that had been in the lead after the regular season the past few seasons. The third rule was put in force to avoid the effect of players intentionally taking yellow cards near the end of the regular season, to make sure they were suspended before the playoffs (mostly against lesser teams) and could start the deciding playoffs with a clean sheet.

Team changes
 Cercle Brugge and Lierse were relegated. Cercle Brugge after losing the relegation playoff series against Lierse, while Lierse lost the promotion playoff.
 Sint-Truiden was promoted as 2014–15 Belgian Second Division champions.
 OH Leuven who won the promotion playoff and returned to the Belgian Pro League just one season after their relegation.

Teams

Stadiums and locations

Personnel and kits

Managerial changes

Regular season

League table

Positions by round
Note: The classification was made after the weekend (or midweek) of each matchday, so postponed matches were only processed at the time they were played to represent the real evolution in standings.

 On matchday 16, the matches Lokeren - Anderlecht and Mouscron-Péruwelz - Charleroi were postponed due to increased safety measures following the November 2015 Paris attacks. These matches were played on 22 and 23 December, between matchdays 20 and 21.

Results

Championship play-offs
The points obtained during the regular season were halved (and rounded up) before the start of the playoff. As a result, the teams started with the following points before the playoff: Club Brugge 32 points, Gent 30, Anderlecht 28, Oostende 25, Genk 24 and Zulte Waregem 22.

Play-off table

Positions by round
Below the positions per round are shown. As teams did not all start with an equal number of points, the initial pre-playoffs positions are also given.

Europa League play-offs
Group A contains the teams finishing the regular season in positions 7, 9, 12 and 14. The teams that finish in positions 8, 10, 11 and 13 are placed in Group B.

Group A

Group B

Europa League play-off final
The winners of both playoff groups compete in a two-legged match to play the fourth-placed team of the championship play-offs, called Testmatch. The winner of this Testmatch was granted an entry to the second qualifying round of the 2016–17 UEFA Europa League.

Charleroi won 3–1 on aggregate.

Testmatches Europa League
The matches were played over two legs between the Europa League play-off final winners and the fourth-placed team of the championship play-offs. The winner qualified for the second qualifying round of the 2016–17 UEFA Europa League.

Genk won 5–3 on aggregate.

Season statistics

Top scorers

Top assists

Multiple goals in one match

Notes

References

Belgian Pro League seasons
Belgian Pro League
1